Van Den Driessche or Vandendriessche is a surname. Notable people with the surname include:

Aurèle Vandendriessche (born 1932), Belgian long-distance runner
Carlos Van den Driessche (1901–1972), Belgian ice hockey player and rower
Femke Van den Driessche, Belgian cyclist
Franky Vandendriessche (born 1971), Belgian footballer
Gaston Vandendriessche (1924–2002), Belgian psychologist
Kévin Vandendriessche (born 1989), French footballer
Kurt Vandendriessche (born 1975), Belgian actor
Lotte Vandendriessche (born 1997), Belgian volleyball player
Pauline van den Driessche (born 1941), British-Canadian applied mathematician
Pol Van Den Driessche, Belgian politician
René Van Den Driessche (born 1928), Belgian fencer
Tom Vandendriessche (born 1978), Belgian politician

Surnames of Dutch origin